The 2015–16 A1 Ethniki is the 85th season of the Greek premier Water polo league and the 30th of A1 Ethniki.

Team information

The following 12 clubs compete in the A1 Ethniki during the 2015–16 season:

Regular season

Standings

Pld - Played; W - Won; D - Drawn; L - Lost; GF - Goals for; GA - Goals against; Diff - Difference; Pts - Points.

Source: A1 Ethniki

Playoffs

Play outs

Final standings

See also
2015–16 LEN Champions League
2015–16 LEN Euro Cup

External links
 Official website 
 Waterpololive.gr 
 Waterpolonews.gr 

Seasons in Greek water polo competitions
Greece
A1 Ethniki
A1 Ethniki
2015 in water polo
2016 in water polo